Ralitsa Georgieva Stoyanova (born 23 May 1989) is a Bulgarian actress. She is best known for voicing the Bulgarian dub of the titular character in Mulan (2020) and for portraying Lora in Women Do Cry (2021).

Life and career
Stoyanova was born on 23 May 1989 in Sofia. She is the daughter of Georgi Stoyanov, a puppeteer and voice actor, and Ekaterina Kazakova, an actress. In 2013, she graduated from the National Academy for Theatre and Film Arts with a degree in acting for puppet theatre.

Stoyanova is involved in the Bulgarian dubbing of films, series and commercials. Her most popular dubbing role was that of Mulan in Disney's 2020 film of the same name. She made her film debut as Lora in Women Do Cry (2021), starring opposite Maria Bakalova. This film was selected to compete in the Un Certain Regard section at the Cannes Film Festival, and was also screened at South by Southwest and the Glasgow Film Festival.

Filmography

Live-action

Voice acting

Films

References 

1989 births
Living people
Actresses from Sofia
21st-century Bulgarian actresses
Bulgarian film actresses
Bulgarian television actresses
Bulgarian voice actresses